Saint-Martin Dam is a dam in Mont-Valin, Quebec, Canada, in the administrative region of Saguenay–Lac-Saint-Jean and the regional county municipality of  Le Fjord-du-Saguenay.

Other dams with this name 
Barrage Saint-Martin in 32000 Auch, Gers, France
Barrage Saint-Martin in 89100 Sens, Yonne, France
Saint-Martin Dam near the village of Quartier Militaire in Mauritius.

References

Dams in Quebec